Machareddy is a village and a mandal in Kamareddy district in the state of Telangana. It is located 20 km towards from district headquarters Kamareddy.

References 

Villages in Nizamabad district